Turégano is a village and municipality of Spain located in the province of Segovia, Castile and León. As of 2019 it has a population of 979 inhabitants. The municipality has a total area of 70,78 km2. The Castle of Turégano dominates over the village.

References 

Municipalities in the Province of Segovia